Tompkins Avenue station may refer to:
 Tompkins Avenue (BMT Lexington Avenue Line), a station on the demolished BMT Lexington Avenue Line
 Tompkins Avenue (BMT Myrtle Avenue Line), a station on the demolished BMT Myrtle Avenue Line